Antonio Kamenjašević (born January 29, 1997 in Zagreb) is a male Greco-Roman wrestler from Croatia. He is a member of HK Herkul.

His best achievement is the bronze medal at the 2021 European Wrestling Championships – Men's Greco-Roman 77 kg in Warsaw, Poland.

Early life 
Kamenjašević started wrestling at the age of 9 in wrestling club "Metalac" in Zagreb. He attended elementary school in Klinča Sela and Sport Gymnasium in Zagreb. Currently, he studies at the Faculty of Kinesiology of the University of Zagreb.

Career 
In 2016, he won silver medal at the European U-23 Championships in Bulgaria in 71 kg category. Following year, he won silver medal at the same competition in Hungary, but this time in 75 kg category, as well as fifth place in Turkey in 2018 in 77 kg category.

He competed in the 77kg event at the 2022 World Wrestling Championships held in Belgrade, Serbia.

References

External links
 

Living people
1997 births
Croatian male sport wrestlers
Sportspeople from Zagreb
Competitors at the 2022 Mediterranean Games
20th-century Croatian people
21st-century Croatian people